Carlo Arienti (21 July 1801 – 21 March 1873) was an Italian painter. He was born in Arcore, Brianza (Other sources say Mantua), and trained in the Brera Academy in Milan under Luigi Sabatelli. He became a professor of art in the same academy, when he was commissioned to paint the staircase of the royal palace in Turin with a depiction of the victory of the Italian army over the Austrians.

In 1837, he painted the Pazzi Conspiracy. The anti-Austrian overtones of his paintings caused him to be exiled him from Milan, but he was invited to Turin by the King Charles Albert of Savoy, and made president (1847-1860) of the Accademia Albertina in Turin, then director of the art academy in Bologna in 1860.

From 1845, he painted an Angels of Calvary. During his years in Piedmont, he painted the Frederick Barbarossa expelled from Alessandria for the Royal Palace Gallery, and later Sister of Jeste, Murder of the Innocents, and a painting of the Pia de' Tolomei. The art historian Antonio Caimi described him as having:  a firm will and with a dignified independence of character he was able to meet and tame the evil fortune that nearly truncated his young career. his youth carrera. The severe nature of Ariente guides his brush with an elegance that could give the appearance of affectedness, however which he always kept within the confines of a serious and grandiose art.

Arienti went on to replace Giovanni Battista Biscarra as professor of painting at the Accademia Albertina from 1843 to 1860. He painted in a neoclassical and romantic style, mainly historic paintings. He died in Bologna.

References

1800 births
1873 deaths
Painters from Bologna
19th-century Italian painters
Italian male painters
Brera Academy alumni
Academic staff of Brera Academy
Academic staff of Accademia Albertina
19th-century Italian male artists